Lifegate Christian School is a private Christian high school in Eugene, Oregon, United States.

The school has been accredited through the Association of Christian Schools International since 1994, and through the Northwest Association of Accredited Schools since 1996.

References

Christian schools in Oregon
High schools in Linn County, Oregon
Private middle schools in Oregon
Private elementary schools in Oregon
Private high schools in Oregon